A bolete is a type of mushroom, or fungal fruiting body. It can be identified thanks to a unique mushroom cap. The cap is clearly different from the stem. On the underside of the cap there is usually a spongy surface with pores, instead of the gills typical of mushrooms. However, there are some boletes that are gilled, such as species of Chroogomphus, Gomphidius, Paxillus, Phylloporus and Hygrophoropsis aurantiaca.

"Bolete" is the English common name for fungus species whose mushroom caps have this appearance.

The boletes are classified in the order Boletales. Not all members of the order Boletales are boletes. The micromorphology and molecular phylogeny of the order Boletales have established that it also contains many gilled, puffball, and other fruit body shapes. A similar pore surface is found in polypores, but these species generally have a different physical structure from boletes, and have different microscopic characteristics than boletes. Many polypores have much firmer, often woody, flesh. 

Boletes are susceptible to infection by the fungus Hypomyces chrysospermus, also known as the bolete eater.

External links
 "Evolution & Morphology in the Homobasidiomycetes" by Gary Lincoff & Michael Wood, MykoWeb.com

 
Mushroom types
Fungal morphology and anatomy
Boletes
Basidiomycota

cs:Hřib